Nortel Simple Loop Prevention Protocol
 Distributed Multi-Link Trunking
 Distributed Split Multi-Link Trunking
 InterSwitch Trunk
 Metro Ethernet Routing Switch 8600
 Multi-link trunking
 Nortel Discovery Protocol
 Provider Backbone Bridge Traffic Engineering
 R-SMLT
 Split multi-link trunking
 UNIStim
 Virtual Link Aggregation Control Protocol

protocols

Nortel